vsftpd, (or very secure FTP daemon), is an FTP server for Unix-like systems, including Linux. It is the default FTP server in the Ubuntu, CentOS, Fedora, NimbleX, Slackware and RHEL Linux distributions. It is licensed under the GNU General Public License. It supports IPv6, TLS and FTPS (explicit since 2.0.0 and implicit since 2.1.0).

Compromised website 
In July 2011, it was discovered that vsftpd version 2.3.4 downloadable from the master site had been compromised. Users logging into a compromised vsftpd-2.3.4 server may issue a ":)" smileyface as the username and gain a command shell on port 6200. This was not an issue of a security hole in vsftpd, instead, an unknown attacker had uploaded a different version of vsftpd which contained a backdoor. Since then, the site was moved to Google App Engine.

See also 

 Comparison of FTP server software
 Pure-FTPd

References

External links 
 Guide to setting up vsftpd including TLS/SSL encryption

FTP server software
Free server software
Free file transfer software
FTP server software for Linux
Unix Internet software
Free software programmed in C